Vakhtang V, born Bakhuta Mukhranbatoni (1618 – September 1675), was the King of Kartli (eastern Georgia) from 1658 until his death, who ruled as a vassal wali for the Persian shah. He is also known under the name of Shah Nawaz, which he assumed on being obliged outwardly to conform to Islam.

Life
The son of Teimuraz I, Prince of Mukhrani, Vakhtang was the first Georgian ruler of the Mukhranian branch of the House of Bagrationi, and succeeded his cousin, David, as the Lord of Mukhrani (Mukhranbatoni) in 1629. He was adopted, in 1653, by the childless ruler of Kartli, Rostom Khan, as his heir and successor to the throne. Vakhtang went to Persia, in 1654, to be confirmed by Abbas II, accepted Islam and took the name Shah Nawaz. He lived for some time in Persia at the court of Abbas, with whom he enjoyed great favour. As regent, he actually ran the government in the last years of Rostom, succeeding him as wali/king of Kartli in 1658.

Vakhtang V (Shahnawaz) followed the policy of his predecessor, managing to maintain a peaceful relationship with his Persian suzerains and to revive the economy of Kartli. Upon his accession, he made efforts to bring other Georgian polities under his control. In 1659, he had Zaal of the Aragvi, an anti-Persian rebel lord and virtual ruler of neighbouring Kakheti, assassinated and confiscated a large portion of his estates. Shahnawaz then intervened in bitter power struggles in western Georgia; he allied himself with the princes of Mingrelia, Guria, and Abkhazia, and put his son, Archil, on the throne of Imereti in 1661, but after the intervention of the Ottomans was to recall his son and to place him, with the shah’s permission, on the throne of Kakheti in 1664. In 1674, Erekle I, a grandson of the late king Teimuraz I of Kakheti, returned from exile in Russia to claim his succession. He was soon summoned to Iran by Shah Suleiman I. Archil thought that the shah would install Erekle as King of Kakheti and therefore attempted, though vainly, to seize the throne of Imereti. Unsuccessful in his efforts, he then fled, together with his brother, Luarsab, to Ahiska (Akhaltsikhe) in Ottoman territory. The shah reacted to this by ordering Shahnawaz to Isfahan. Shahnawaz left his son, George, to rule Kartli and himself began his journey to Persia. He died, however, on the road at Khoskaro, Ganja, in September 1675, and was buried in Qum, Iran.

Family and children
Vakhtang was married twice. His first wife was Rodam Kaplanishvili-Orbeliani, daughter of Prince Kaplan Baratashvili and founder of the Orbeliani family. At the insistence of the shah of Iran, Vakhtang had to divorce, with great reluctance, Rodam on his accession to the throne of Kartli, to marry Mariam Dadiani, (died 1682), widow of his adopted father Rostom. Rodam became a nun under the name of Catherine and died at Tbilisi in 1691. All of Vakhtang's children were mothered by Rodam. These were: 

 Archil (1647–1713), sometime king of Kakheti and of Imereti.
 George XI (Gurgin Khan; 1651–1709), king of Kartli.
 Levan (Shah-Quli Khan) (c. 1653–1709), regent of Kartli.
 Alexander (Iskander Mirza; fl. 1666 – 1697), a darogha (prefect) of the Persian capital Isfahan in 1667. Married Mehr Sharf Begum, a daughter of Izz-i-Sharf and Mirza Abdollah al-Husayni al-Marashi.
 Luarsab (died 1698), whose natural son, Alexander (died 1711), was a Safavid commander in Afghanistan.
 Solomon (Suleiman Mirza; died 1703), who was married to Tamar, daughter of Shalva, Duke of Ksani, and had a son, Oman;
 An anonymous daughter, who married, in 1655, Zurab, Duke of Aragvi (died 1661).
 Anuka (died 1697), who was sent in the harem of Shah Abbas II in 1660. After Abbas's death, his successor Shah Suleiman I gave Anuka in marriage to Shah Verdi Khan of Luristan to the chagrin of Anuka's brother George XI of Kartli.
 Tamar (died 1694), who married, in 1661, Prince Givi Amilakhvari (c. 1634 – 1700) and had five children. She became a nun in her widowhood under the name of Gaiane.
 Elene.

References

Sources
 

 Political history of Georgia 1658–1703, excerpt from David Marshall Lang, The Last years of the Georgian Monarchy, 1658–1832
Vakhtang V (In Georgian)

1618 births
1675 deaths
17th-century people from Georgia (country)
House of Mukhrani
Regents of Georgia
Safavid appointed kings of Kartli
Converts to Shia Islam from Eastern Orthodoxy
Former Georgian Orthodox Christians
Muslims from Georgia (country)
Iranian people of Georgian descent
Burials in Iran
17th-century people of Safavid Iran